The Institec Justicialista was a line of cars produced by the government of Argentina via IAME (Industrias Aeronáuticas y Mecánicas del Estado) from 1954 to 1955 as an  attempt to develop a native Argentine automotive industry. It used a front-engine, front-wheel-drive layout with a two-stroke two-cylinder engine derived from a German DKW design and a conventional metal body. Due to the insistence of General Juan Domingo Perón a sports car prototype was made, a two-seat version was showcase as roadster in the Paris Motor Show. The prototype was repurposed Porsche with a fiberglass body powered by a 1.5-liter air-cooled Porsche flat-four engine and a Porsche four-speed gearbox driving the front wheels.

When General Perón was overthrown in 1955, the project was abandoned. Mismanagement, poor sales and along with poor quality  when compared to other locally produced cars lead to the quick disappearance of the Justicialista. It was later briefly revived as the short lived Wartburg-powered Graciela. Overall, the line was sparingly produced and had few sales.

Development

On the 30 of November 1949 the then President of the Argentine Nation Juan Domingo Perón signed a decree by which a military factory in Cordoba, until then used by the Navy, would be retooled for motor vehicle production.

Lacking any form of basic technical know-how and without the time or money for proper research and development, German DKW cars were bought from abroad and reverse-engineered. The original DKW two-cylinder engine was deemed to small for larger cars and a two-stroke Puch V engine was proposed.

Production 
From the beginning the Justicialista was designed as a more jingoistic alternative and marketed towards the middle class. The assembly lines were operated by workers with military backgrounds and the factory managers employed a military management approach, which rendered the factories as extensions of the barracks. Less than 200 units were allegedly produced and it never became commercially available.

Models
 Justicialista 800 Sedan (M800-powered)
 Justicialista Gran Turismo
 Justicialista van (Wartburg-powered)
 Justicialista truck
 Justicialista "Graciela" sedan (Wartburg-powered)
 Gauchita
 Justicialista Grand Sport (prototype; displayed at the Paris Motor Show)

End of production
Very few cars were ever produced. Some sources claim to be able to determine the number of manufactured vehicles for some models, but factory production reports and sale figures were lost or non-existent. Modern examples are often hard to authenticate since more replicas where built later on by enthusiasts, often using surplus body parts with engines from other vehicles, other than those built by IAME.

In 1955, all Justicialista lines were discontinued. The assembly plant was sold to Porsche and renamed Teramo. Soon production began for the short lived Porsche Puntero local variant of the Porsche 356A.

Technical

Engine (M800)
 800 cc water-cooled two-stroke four-cylinder
Bore and stroke: 48 x 56 mm
  @ 4500 rpm
 6.5:1 compression ratio
 Solex carburetors
 AC44 spark plugs

Transmission
 Multiple-disc clutch in oil bath
 Three-speed gearbox
 Helical-gear differential
Floating-axis means

Chassis
 Chassis with rails for built in welded sheet drawer
 Independent front transverse leaf spring suspension with hairpin springs
 Independent rear torsion bar suspension, cross laminated with eight 5 mm thick sheets
 Double-action telescopic shock absorbers
 Hydraulic foot brake and mechanical handbrake
Rack and pinion steering
 3,25 x 16 disc wheel with pressed steel wheels 3.25 x 16
 5.00 x 16 tires

Measurements
 1200 mm front track
 1250 mm rear track
 5 m radio address
 200 mm minimum above the floor light
 35 L fuel capacity
 Naphtha consumption 7.8 L/100 km
 120 km/h top speed

See also
 IAME Rastrojero
 List of automobiles manufactured in Argentina
 Lists of automobile-related articles
 List of automobile manufacturers

References

 The history of the IAME factory 

Cars of Argentina
Cars introduced in 1953